Waheeda Rehman (born 3 February 1938) is an Indian actress and dancer. Regarded as one of Hindi cinema's finest actresses, Rehman's accolades include a National Film Award and three Filmfare Awards. Rehman was honoured with the Padma Shri by Government of India in 1972, later receiving the Padma Bhushan in 2011. She has received significant media coverage across her film career.

Rehman made her acting debut with the Telugu film Rojulu Marayi (1955), and rose to prominence with her collaborations with filmmaker Guru Dutt: the romantic dramas Pyaasa (1957) and Kaagaz Ke Phool (1959), the musical romance Chaudhvin Ka Chand (1960) and the drama Sahib Bibi Aur Ghulam (1962). Rehman had her breakthrough with the romantic drama Guide (1965), for which she received widespread critical acclaim and received the Filmfare Award for Best Actress. She won the award again for her performance in the romantic thriller Neel Kamal (1968), and additionally earned nominations for her roles in the comedy Ram Aur Shyam (1967) and the drama Khamoshi (1969).

For portraying a clans woman in the crime drama Reshma Aur Shera (1971), she won the National Film Award for Best Actress. From the early 1970s, Rehman has worked primarily in supporting roles, appearing in the romance Phagun (1973), the musical romantic dramas Kabhi Kabhie (1976), Chandni (1989) and Lamhe (1991). In 1994, she was honoured with the Filmfare Lifetime Achievement Award, and she has since worked sporadically in film.

Apart from her acting career, Rehman is a philanthropist. She is an advocate for education and is an ambassador for Rang De, an organisation combating poverty in India.

Early life 
Waheeda Rehman was born on 3 February 1938 to a Deccani Muslim family in Chengalpet of present-day Tamil Nadu, India. It is a common misconception that Rehman was born in Hyderabad instead of Tamil Nadu. Her father was Mohammed Abdur Rehman and her mother was Mumtaz Begum, and she was the youngest out of 4 daughters. As a child, she and her sisters were trained Bharatanatyam in Chennai. She studied in St. Joseph's Convent in Visakhapatnam when her father was posted there in the then-Madras Presidency. Her father, who worked as a district commissioner, died in 1951 while she was in her early teens.

Rehman's dream was to become a doctor, but due to her family's circumstances emotionally and financially, alongside her mother's illness, she abandoned her goal. In order to help her family, she accepted movie offers that stemmed from her dancing abilities. Rehman's first performance on stage as a dancer in earlier days was at Brahmapur's Ganjam Kala Parishad organised by her uncle Dr. Ferose Ali who was a famous doctor and social activist in Brahmapur.

Acting career

Beginnings and breakthrough 
Rehman made her film debut with the 1955 Telugu films Rojulu Maraayi and Jayasimha. For the former, she appeared as a dancer in the song "Eruvaka Saagaro". In the year following, Rehman made a cameo in the Tamil film Alibabavum 40 Thirudargalum (1956). Based on the folktale Ali Baba and the Forty Thieves, it is the first Tamil film to be colourised. In the mid-1950s, Rehman established a working relationship with Dev Anand. They had a number of successful films to their credit which include Solva Saal (1958); Suresh Kohli of The Hindu writes on her performance in Solva Saal, "Though barely 20 then and only in her fourth Hindi release, Rehman demonstrates her class: both in serious scenes demanding intensity and through sparkling, mischievous eye movements during lighter moments."

Collaborations with Guru Dutt
Rehman's performances caught the eye of Hindi filmmaker Guru Dutt, whom Rehman considered her mentor. Dutt brought her to Bombay (current-day Mumbai) and cast her as Kamini in the crime thriller C.I.D. (1956). Because of actresses such as Madhubala, Nargis and Meena Kumari, Rehman was asked to use a stage name, reasoning that her name should be "something sexy" however she refused to do, and kept her birth name. Dutt would next cast her in her first lead role in the drama Pyaasa (1957), where she portrayed a prostitute; the film was a commercial success, and it has been regarded by critics as one of the greatest films ever made. Continued collaborations with Dutt include the noir film 12 O'Clock (1958), the romantic drama Kaagaz Ke Phool (1959), and the Muslim social film Chaudhvin Ka Chand (1960), all of which earned her critical praise. Rehman and Dutt's last collaboration was the romantic drama Sahib Bibi Aur Ghulam (1962), which starred Dutt, Kumari, and Rehman herself in a supporting role. The film was a major success, being lauded by both Indian and international critics. This earned Rehman her first Filmfare nomination in the category of Best Supporting Actress, meanwhile the film itself received nominations for the Golden Bear at the 13th Berlin International Film Festival and won the Filmfare Award for Best Film. Dutt broke his collaboration with Rehman due to personal struggles, later dying in 1964.

Widespread success 
The actress next ventured into Bengali film-making with Satyajit Ray's film Abhijan (1962). Following this, she played a murder suspect in Baat Ek Raat Ki (1962), a girl embroiled in a sibling feud in Rakhi (1962) and an infertile woman in Ek Dil Sau Afsane (1963). As a leading lady, she was cast opposite many familiar faces of Hindi Cinema; notably, this includes Sunil Dutt in Mujhe Jeene Do (1962), Nirupa Roy in Kaun Apna Kaun Paraya (1963) and Biswajit in the horror film Kohraa (1964), the drama Majboor (1964), and the psychological-thriller Bees Saal Baad (1962)—the latter becoming the highest-grossing Hindi film of 1962. At the end of 1964, Rehman became the third-highest paid actress in Hindi films, from 1959 to 1964.

Rehman's peak continued when she was paired with other well-established superstars, namely Dilip Kumar, Rajendra Kumar, Raj Kapoor, and Rajesh Khanna. Among her most acclaimed films of the late 1960s include Teesri Kasam (1966), which won the National Film Award for Best Feature Film, Ram Aur Shyam (1967), Neel Kamal (1968) and Khamoshi (1969). The last three films each earned Rehman consecutive nominations for the Filmfare Award for Best Actress each, winning for Neel Kamal. In her highly praised role in Khamoshi starring alongside Rajesh Khanna and Dharmendra, she plays a nurse who goes mentally insane after falling in love with one of her patients, and eventually is sent to her own mental institution. Other commercial successes of this period were Patthar Ke Sanam (1967) and Aadmi (1968). At the end of the 1960s, Rehman ranked a new record amongst herself in becoming the second-paid actress in Hindi films, from 1964 to 1969. She states herself, "For Solva Saal, my first film as a freelancer, I received ₹30,000. The highest I ever earned in my career was Rs. 7 lakh for a film."

Guide and Reshma Aur Shera

Vijay Anand's magnum opus, the 1965 romantic drama Guide was an adaptation of the same book written by R. K. Narayan, published in 1958. Rehman starred as Rosie, a rebellious, strong-willed wife of an unfaithful archaeologist. She stated that the role proved difficult for her, particularly because it broke several film stereotypes at the time. Guide was a major commercial success, emerging as the fifth-highest grossing Hindi film of 1965, and it opened to widespread critical acclaim, with Rehman's performance receiving particular praise. Trisha Gupta of Hindustan Times writing, "Rosie was triply unusual: a woman who walks out of an unhappy marriage, begins a romantic relationship with a man who isn’t her husband, and simultaneously embarks on a successful career as a dancer. She would be an unusual Hindi film heroine even today..." and ranked her performance amongst Indian cinema's greatest. For her performance, Rehman won the Filmfare Award for Best Actress, and Guide went on to win the National Film Award for Best Feature Film and the Filmfare Award for Best Film. It became India's official entry to the Oscars, though it did not get nominated. It is now considered a cult classic, and is considered Rehman's signature film performance. For headlining the film Reshma Aur Shera (1971), Rehman won the National Film Award for Best Actress, which is India's equivalent to the Academy Award for Best Actress. Reshma Aur Shera also received nominations for the Golden Bear at the 22nd Berlin International Film Festival and garnered her praise from critics, however the film failed at the box office.

Later roles and sporadic work 
Rehman began experimenting with roles at this stage of career. She accepted the offer to play a mother to Jaya Bhaduri in Phagun (1973). In her new innings from the '70s, her successful films include Kabhi Kabhie (1976), Trishul (1978), Jwalamukhi (1980), Naseeb (1981), Namkeen (1982), Dharam Kanta (1982), Namak Halaal (1982), Coolie (1983), Mashaal (1984), Chandni (1989) and Lamhe (1991). Kabhi Kabhie, Namkeen, Chandni and Lamhe garnered her nominations for the Filmfare Award for Best Supporting Actress. Film expert Rajesh Subramanian reported that Manmohan Desai had approached Rehman, on behalf of Shammi Kapoor, during the making of Naseeb. In the song "John Jani Janardhan", Kapoor and Rehman make a grand-entry holding hands. Incidentally, this was the first time the two stars appeared together on screen. After her appearance in Lamhe (1991), she announced a sabbatical from the film industry.

Initially, Rehman was supposed to play the role of her frequent co-star Amitabh Bachchan's mother in Karan Johar's ensemble family drama Kabhi Khushi Kabhie Gham... (2001). However, after having shot a few scenes, she dropped out of the film due to her husband's death in November 2000; subsequently, her role was then played by Achala Sachdev. In recent years, she has played motherly roles in Om Jai Jagadish (2002), Water (2005), 15 Park Avenue (2005), Rang De Basanti (2006) and Delhi 6 (2009), all of which earned her critical acclaim. In 2011, she was honoured by the Government of India with the Padma Bhushan, and in 2013 with the Cenetary Award for Indian Film Personality for her contribution to Indian Cinema. A biography has been written and published in 2014 about Rehman, entitled Conversations With Waheeda Rehman, which consist of interviews collected by author and director Nasreen Munni Kabir.

Personal life 
In April 1974, Rehman married Shashi Rekhi (also known by his screen name Kamaljeet), and both had worked together prior in the film Shagoon (1964). She has 2 children: Sohail Rekhi and Kashvi Rekhi, both of them are writers. After her marriage, she lived in a farmhouse in Bangalore but after the death of her husband on 21 November 2000, she moved back to her sea-view bungalow in Bandra, Mumbai, where she currently resides.

Rehman is private about her life and seldom speaks about it, as said in an interview at the launch of Conversations with Waheeda Rehman: "I don’t want to get into it. My private life should remain private. It is nobody’s business. I know we are public figures, so when I fight with my husband, do you want to know about it?"

Works and accolades

Filmography

Awards and nominations

Honours 
Padma Shri in 1972 
Filmfare Lifetime Achievement Award in 1994
IIFA Lifetime Achievement Award in 2001
In October 2004, a Waheeda Rehman film-retrospective was held at the Seattle Art Museum and the University of Washington where Rehman participated in spirited-panel-and-audience discussions on her most memorable films; Pyaasa, Teesri Kasam and Guide.
NTR National Award in 2006
Padma Bhushan in 2011
Rashtriya Kishore Kumar Samman from the Government of Madhya Pradesh in 2020

Further reading

References

Sources

External links

 
 
 Waheeda Rehman Interview
A Film Retrospective in Seattle. October 2004
 Popular Waheeda Rehman songs
 Queen of Hearts – interview with Rehman published in The Hindu

Indian film actresses
Actresses from Tamil Nadu
Living people
Actresses in Hindi cinema
Best Actress National Film Award winners
People from Kanchipuram district
Recipients of the Padma Bhushan in arts
Recipients of the Padma Shri in arts
1938 births
Actresses from Vijayawada
Actresses in Bengali cinema
Actresses in Telugu cinema
20th-century Indian actresses
21st-century Indian actresses
Filmfare Awards winners
Filmfare Lifetime Achievement Award winners
Actresses in Malayalam cinema
Actresses in Tamil cinema